Martin Stone may refer to:

Danny Burch, English wrestler that wrestled with stage name Martin Stone
Martin Stone (actor), actor in British TV serial The Chronicles of Narnia
Martin William Francis Stone, philosopher and former professor
Martin Stone (guitarist) (1946–2016), guitarist and rare book dealer
Martin Stone, co-founder of the Carlin Motorsport team
The Balluderon Stone, a Pictish cross slab in Angus, Scotland, also known as Martin's Stone